The 1972 East Carolina Pirates football team was an American football team that represented East Carolina University as a member of the Southern Conference during the 1972 NCAA University Division football season. In their second season under head coach Sonny Randle, the team compiled a 9–2 record.

Schedule

References

East Carolina
East Carolina Pirates football seasons
Southern Conference football champion seasons
East Carolina Pirates football